3-Deazaneplanocin A (DZNep, C-c3Ado) is a drug which acts as both a S-adenosylhomocysteine synthesis inhibitor and also a histone methyltransferase EZH2 inhibitor. Studies have shown that it has in vitro against a variety of different tumor cell lines.

In studies on mice, the drug was also found to be effective for the treatment of Ebola virus disease, apparently interfering with the Ebola viruses ability to block interferon production, thus restoring the ability of immune system to rid the body of ebolavirus.

References

Nucleosides
Imidazopyridines
Polyols
Experimental drugs
Cyclopentenes